Brian Kidd (born 29 May 1949) is an English football coach and former player, who was most recently assistant coach of Manchester City, alongside manager Pep Guardiola.

Kidd was also assistant to Manchester United manager Alex Ferguson from 1991 to 1998. In this role he was pivotal in the development of a group of young footballers known as Fergie's Fledglings.

Kidd's first spell as assistant manager of Manchester City came under manager Roberto Mancini, who moved Kidd from the youth setup to become his sole assistant manager. After one year, Kidd became a co-assistant, initially alongside Attilio Lombardo and latterly alongside David Platt. Following the departure of Mancini, Kidd had a brief spell as caretaker manager of Manchester City for two games at the close of the 2012–13 season, as well as the USA tour. Under the subsequent helm of Manuel Pellegrini of Manchester City, Kidd was the co-assistant manager, alongside Rubén Cousillas.

Kidd, who featured as a striker, played for Manchester United, Arsenal, Manchester City, Everton, Bolton Wanderers, Fort Lauderdale Strikers and the Minnesota Strikers in his footballing career.

Playing career
Kidd was born in Collyhurst, Manchester, and started playing for Manchester United as a youngster whose academy he joined in August 1964. Two years later, he went on to become a professional player with the club.

Kidd had the distinction of scoring on his 19th birthday for Manchester United in their 4–1 victory over Benfica in the 1968 European Cup Final. All in all, he scored 52 times in 203 league appearances for Manchester United.

Following United's relegation to the Football League Second Division in 1974, Kidd was transferred to Arsenal for £110,000. Kidd scored on his debut for Arsenal against Leicester City at Filbert Street. He then scored a brace at home against Manchester City. He was by far Arsenal's top goalscorer during the 1974–75 season, scoring 19 goals in 40 appearances. In the following season Kidd, on 20 March 1976, scored a hat-trick against West Ham United in a 6–1 win at Highbury. Altogether Kidd scored 34 times for Arsenal from 90 appearances. In July 1976, he was sold to Manchester City for a fee of £100,000.

With Manchester City, Kidd scored three times against rivals Manchester United, in a 3–1 win at Maine Road and a 2–2 draw at Old Trafford during the 1977–78 season. He would play 98 times for Manchester City, netting 44 goals. He then moved to Everton in March 1979 for £150,000. With the Toffees, Kidd netted 12 times in 44 appearances and was sent off in an FA Cup semi final against West Ham United. Kidd then joined Bolton Wanderers in May 1980 for £110,000. Kidd found the back of the net a total of 13 times for Bolton where he made a total of 43 appearances at and away from Burnden Park. He was then loaned out to NASL team Atlanta Chiefs in 1981. He played 29 times for the chiefs, scoring on 23 occasions.

In January 1982, Kidd moved on from Bolton to return to the NASL. He then signed with the Fort Lauderdale Strikers and two years afterward with the Minnesota Strikers. He was prolific with both teams when it came to goalscoring, but in 1984 he retired from the game.

International career
Kidd was capped twice for the England national football team with both of those appearances coming in 1970.

Management and coaching career

1984–2008
In 1984, Kidd began his coaching career at Barrow. He briefly managed Preston North End for several games in 1986. Kidd then became involved in coaching young players before being brought back to Manchester United as a youth team coach by Alex Ferguson in 1988. Over the next three years Kidd helped to bring through a host of talented players like Ryan Giggs and Darren Ferguson. When Ferguson's assistant Archie Knox moved to a similar capacity at Glasgow Rangers in the summer of 1991, Kidd was promoted to the role of assistant manager. He helped Ferguson guide United to a Football League Cup win in 1992, the Premier League title in 1993, the double in 1994 and again in 1996, as well as another Premier League title in 1997.

Kidd left United to take charge at Blackburn Rovers in December 1998, replacing Roy Hodgson who had been sacked after Blackburn's poor start to the season left them in the relegation zone. Despite Kidd having a promising start with Rovers, which saw him voted Premier League Manager of the Month and having also spent nearly £20 million on new players in his first four months in charge he was unable to save them from being relegated from the Premier League (just four years after being champions) and Kidd was dismissed on 3 November 1999 with Rovers standing 19th in Division One.

In 1999, a rift developed between Kidd and Alex Ferguson after Kidd was strongly criticised in Ferguson's autobiography Managing My Life. Ferguson was angered that when Kidd was his assistant manager he had questioned United's 1998 summer signing of striker Dwight Yorke. Ferguson criticised Kidd's footballing judgement and wrote in his book: "I saw Brian Kidd as a complex person, often quite insecure, particularly about his health." Kidd was upset at Ferguson's attack on him and responded by saying: "I believe Walt Disney is trying to buy the film rights to his book as a sequel to Fantasia."

Kidd moved to Leeds United in May 2000 as youth coach but was promoted to act as Head Coach in March 2001 under David O'Leary then Terry Venables. He left Leeds in May 2003 after Peter Reid was appointed manager.

Meanwhile, Kidd was named as assistant to England manager Sven-Göran Eriksson in January 2003. He was forced to end this role in May 2004, just weeks before Euro 2004, due to undergoing surgery for prostate cancer. Kidd had recovered by February 2006.

In August 2006, former United player Roy Keane was appointed manager of Sunderland and there were reports that Keane wanted Kidd to become his assistant manager at the Stadium of Light. However, Kidd instead accepted an offer to work as assistant to Neil Warnock at Sheffield United a few months after their promotion to the Premier League. After the Blades were relegated and Warnock resigned, Kidd remained at Bramall Lane under new manager Bryan Robson (another former Manchester United player) but left the club after Robson departed in February 2008.

2009–present
On 11 February 2009, Kidd was appointed as the assistant to caretaker manager Paul Hart at Premier League side Portsmouth. He stayed until August 2009, when he rejected a new contract offer.

Kidd became Technical Development Manager at Manchester City in September 2009, before becoming assistant manager to new boss Roberto Mancini on 19 December 2009, following the sacking of manager Mark Hughes.

In February 2011, Kidd said that he was willing to give Alex Ferguson "the benefit of the doubt" in the dispute that the two men had in the late 1990s. Kidd revealed that although there was no phone call from Ferguson when he was fighting prostate cancer in 2004, he was now speaking to Ferguson after matches again.

In the 2011 FA Cup Final, Manchester City won their first major trophy for 35 years after beating Stoke City 1–0. In the following 2011–12 season, City were crowned league champions for the first time since 1968. In an extraordinary finale to the season, City scored twice in stoppage time to beat Queens Park Rangers 3–2 in dramatic style to win the Premier League on goal difference from Manchester United. Together with Mancini and City's first team coach David Platt, Kidd raced on to the pitch to celebrate Sergio Agüero's title-winning goal for City.

Kidd served as caretaker manager for the final two games of the 2012–13 season, following the departure of Mancini. Kidd returned to his assistant role following the appointment of Manuel Pellegrini and worked with both him and his successor Pep Guardiola, before leaving after the 2020–21 season.

Honours

Player
Manchester United
European Cup: 1967–68
FA Charity Shield: 1967

Manager
Individual
Premier League Manager of the Month: December 1998

Career statistics

Manager

References

External links

Football Association – Brian Kidd profile
NASL stats

1949 births
Living people
People from Collyhurst
Footballers from Manchester
English footballers
England international footballers
England under-23 international footballers
Manchester United F.C. players
Arsenal F.C. players
Manchester City F.C. players
Everton F.C. players
Bolton Wanderers F.C. players
English Football League players
North American Soccer League (1968–1984) players
North American Soccer League (1968–1984) indoor players
Atlanta Chiefs players
Fort Lauderdale Strikers (1977–1983) players
Minnesota Strikers (NASL) players
English football managers
Barrow A.F.C. managers
Preston North End F.C. managers
Manchester United F.C. non-playing staff
Leeds United F.C. non-playing staff
Sheffield United F.C. non-playing staff
Manchester City F.C. non-playing staff
Premier League managers
Blackburn Rovers F.C. managers
Manchester City F.C. managers
Portsmouth F.C. non-playing staff
Association football forwards
English Football League representative players
English expatriate sportspeople in the United States
Expatriate soccer players in the United States
English expatriate footballers
UEFA Champions League winning players